Conclusion of an Age is the debut album from Sylosis, a British metal band from Reading, Berkshire. The album was released on 24 October 2008 and was produced and recorded by Scott Atkins at Grindstone Studios. It was also the last release by the band to feature Jamie Graham on vocals.

Although it is not strictly a concept album, there is a theme running throughout the album that relates to the collapse of human civilization and the return of the Earth to its natural state. The band stated in a press release that the album's lyrical theme deals with "the direction in which the planet is heading and the consequences humanity will face. The album covers many areas, but the main concept is the idea of mankind destroying itself through war, self-indulgence, religion etc. and how the earth is being ravaged by humanity to the point of being destroyed... but how the Earth's might will eventually prevail!"

On March 8, 2021, Sylosis announced a vinyl release of Conclusion of an Age and released "Plight of the Soul", a previously unreleased B-side track from the album.

Track listing

Personnel
Jamie Graham - lead vocals
Josh Middleton - lead/rhythm guitar, piano
Carl Parnell - bass
Rob Callard - drums, percussion
Alex Bailey - rhythm guitar (additional)

Guest Musician:
Adam Frakes-Sime - backing vocal (track 5)
Chris O'Toole - guitar solo (track 10)

References 

2008 debut albums
Sylosis albums
Nuclear Blast albums